Raband may refer to:
Rəbənd, Azerbaijan
Rah Band-e Olya, Iran